Deepshikha Deshmukh (born 29 October 1983, née Bhagnani) is an Indian film producer who works in Hindi cinema. She is the daughter of film producer Vashus Bhagnani and Pooja Bhagnani, and sister of actor-producer Jackky Bhagnani. She has produced multiple films under the production house Pooja Entertainment. In 2020, she produced Jawaani Jaaneman and the remake of 1995's cult classic Coolie No.1, under the same name. Deepshikha is also the founder of an organic skincare brand called Love Organically.

Early & Personal life
Deepshikha was born on 30 October 1981, in Kolkata, West Bengal to film producer Vashu Bhagnani and his wife, Pooja Bhagnani. She has a younger brother, Jackky Bhagnani who is an actor and film producer. Her nickname is Honey.

She is married to Dhiraj Vilasrao Deshmukh, MLA from Latur Rural constituency, Maharashtra and has two children. Her husband is the younger brother of actor Riteish Deshmukh and the younger son of late politician Vilasrao Deshmukh

Career
Deepshikha Deshmukh leads the strategy and production efforts at Pooja Entertainment. She debuted as a producer in 2016 with Aishwarya Rai Bachchan and Randeep Hooda starrer 'Sarbjit'. With a focus to back meaningful cinema and social issues, she has opted for strong subject oriented films like 'Madaari' starring Irrfan Khan. She also partnered with Priyanka Chopra as a producer for Pooja Entertainment's first Punjabi film 'Sarvann'.

In 2018, she produced the film “Welcome to New York”. The film starred Sonakshi Sinha, Diljit Dosanjh and Karan Johar. In the same year she also produced “Dil Juunglee” starring Taapsee Pannu and Saqib Saleem.

In 2020, she produced the film Jawaani Jaaneman, starring Saif Ali Khan, Tabu, Alaya F in the lead. The film also marked Alaya's debut into the industry. End of the same year, Coolie No. 1 (2020) which was a remake of the 1995 film, was released on an OTT platform. The original film and the remake, both were produced by Pooja Entertainment.

Deepshikha's next film as a producer is a spy thriller called “BellBottom” starring Akshay Kumar in the lead alongside Vaani Kapoor, Lara Dutta and Huma Qureshi released in 2021 but emerged as a commercial failure. Her upcoming projects as a producure are an action drama, "Ganapath" starring Tiger Shroff and Kriti Sanon. and also multilingual historic drama "Suryaputra Mahavir Karna" directed by R.S. Vimal.

Philanthropic work

Deepshikha stands up against animal cruelty and strongly condemns the minimal fine that is levied for animal abuse. She is a strong advocate for a cracker free Diwali, for years to come and also especially now in view of the COVID-19 pandemic. Deepshikha's environmental consciousness starts with simple acts of planting saplings in villages, alongside inculcating in her kids the need to do the same – thus equipping the future generation to drive change.

Entrepreneurial venture

Love Organically

Deepshikha is the founder of a skincare brand called Love Organically. The brand, which is among the first organic skincare brands in India for kids and adults, delivers products that are 100% natural and free from harmful chemicals. Love Organically is made in India and sources its ingredients from local farms across the country.

The brand focuses on their mantra of giving back to the environment as well as to the farmers. Their collaboration with different non-profit organizations provides education to the children of drought-affected farmers. A portion of the profit from every product sold is donated to the cause. All products of this brands try to protect the environment by not using harmful ingredients.

Filmography

As Producer

Awards And recognition

References

External links
 Deepshikha Deshmukh on Instagram
 Deepshikha Deshmukh on Twitter

Living people
Indian film producers
1983 births